Philip Mark Jasner (March 24, 1942 – December 3, 2010) was a sports journalist in Philadelphia.

Formative years
Jasner was born in Philadelphia on March 24, 1942.

Professional life
Phil Jasner joined the staff of the Philadelphia Daily News in 1972. Jasner covered the 76ers and the NBA on a full-time basis from 1981 until his death. Jasner was a past president of the Professional Basketball Writers Association and the Philadelphia College Basketball Writers Association. He was the Pennsylvania Sports Writer of the Year for 1999, and was presented the 2004 Curt Gowdy Media Award, presented by the Naismith Basketball Hall of Fame for outstanding contributions to the sport during his career; he was a finalist for the award in 2001, when he also received a lifetime achievement award from the Professional Basketball Writers Association during the NBA Finals. Along the way, he has covered high school sports, the Philadelphia Big 5, the Eagles and the NFL, the World Football League, the North American Soccer League and what was then the Major Indoor Soccer League. He was a graduate of Temple University, where he worked at The Temple News, and spent his early professional days at the Pottstown (Pa.) Mercury, Montgomery Newspapers (Fort Washington, Pa.), the Norristown (Pa.) Times-Herald and the Trentonian.

Death
Jasner died in Philadelphia on December 3, 2010.

References

External links 
Phil Jasner at the Philadelphia Daily News

1942 births
2010 deaths
Jewish American journalists
Deaths from cancer in Pennsylvania
Writers from Philadelphia
Temple University alumni
Journalists from Pennsylvania
Sportswriters from Pennsylvania
21st-century American Jews